Peotyle atmodesma is a moth in the family Choreutidae. It was described by Edward Meyrick in 1933. It is found in Kashmir.

References

Choreutidae
Moths described in 1933